Startsevo may refer to:
Startsevo, Bulgaria, a village in Smolyan Province, Bulgaria
Startsevo, Russia, several rural localities in Russia